Amalendu Guha (30 January 1924 – 7 May 2015) was an Indian historian, economist, and poet from Assam, India.

He was born in Imphal, Manipur. He completed his MA from Presidency College. He started his teaching career at Darrang College, Tezpur, and also taught at Gokhale Institute of Politics and Economics, Pune, and thereafter at Delhi School of Economics.

Books
 Planter Raj to Swaraj – Freedom Struggle & Electoral Politics in Assam
 Medieval and Early Colonial Assam: Society, Polity, Economy

References

Poets from Assam
Indian Marxist historians
Indian political writers
1924 births
2015 deaths
20th-century Indian poets
20th-century Indian historians
Scientists from Assam
People from Imphal